Hólar Cathedral (Icelandic: Hóladómkirkja) is a Church of Iceland cathedral church located in Hólar, Iceland. The church is the official church of the Bishop of Hólar, currently Solveig Lára Guðmundsdóttir.

History
The Cathedral lost its cathedral status in 1801 when the Diocese of Hólar was dissolved and amalgamated in the united Diocese of Iceland. It became a cathedral once more in 1909 when the diocese was re-established, this time as a suffragan see, with the bishop of Hólar being the suffragan bishop to the Bishop of Iceland.

The present church stands in the place of 6 other previous churches, the first one built in 1050 by Oxa Hjaltasonar. The second was built between 1050 and 1106. The third built after 1106 by Bishop Jón Ögmundsson. The fourth was built around 1300 by Bishop Jörundur Þorsteinsson while the fifth one was built around 1394 by Bishop Pétur Nikulásson. The sixth was constructed by Halldóru Guðbrandsdóttur around 1627, it being the first Lutheran church since the reformation. The final and present church was built between 1757 and 1763 through the initiatives of Bishop Gísli Magnússon. The cathedral was consecrated on November 20, 1763.

Tower
The church building never had a steeple however a tower was built in 1950 adjacent to the church as a memorial to the last catholic bishop of Hólar Jón Arason and his two sons who were killed in 1550 as a result of their opposition to the reformation.

See also 
 List of cathedrals in Iceland

References

Church of Iceland
Cathedrals in Iceland
18th-century Lutheran churches
Churches completed in 1763